Yankee Clipper is a three masted sailing cruise ship that served for Windjammer Barefoot Cruises. She was originally built in Kiel, Germany as the Cressida, an armor plated private yacht. She was a prize in World War II. She was acquired by the Vanderbilts and was renamed Pioneer. In 1965, the ship was acquired by Windjammer Barefoot cruises.

Cabins
Yankee Clipper has five different cabin types; Standard cabin junior, standard cabin, deck cabin, captain's cabin, and admiral suite.

Out of service
When the Yankee Clipper's owner, Windjammer Barefoot Cruises went out of business in 2007, the ship retired and she is permanently docked in Trinidad.

References

External links
www.jammerbabe.com/Ship_YankeeClipper.htm

Cruise ships
1927 ships